The Old Rock School (also known as the Guntersville City School) is a historic building in Guntersville, Alabama.  The one-story building was constructed in 1926 in a flat-figure 8 shape, with two courtyards in the middle.  It was built in the American Craftsman style, with rock facing and exposed rafters tails.  The school was born of Progressive Era philosophy of providing proper facilities for education, including modern plumbing, proper lighting and ventilation, and ample open space.  An auditorium allowed for classes in drama and music, as well as public concerts and performances.  After the school was replaced in the 1970s, several other groups utilized the building.  Its current tenant is The Whole Backstage, a non-profit youth drama organization.  A new, 337-seat auditorium was constructed in 2005.  The building was listed on the National Register of Historic Places in 2003.

References

National Register of Historic Places in Marshall County, Alabama
School buildings on the National Register of Historic Places in Alabama
School buildings completed in 1926
Schools in Marshall County, Alabama
1926 establishments in Alabama